Lyantonde District is a district in southern Central Uganda. It is named after the 'chief town' of the district, Lyantonde, where the district headquarters are located.

Location
Lyantonde District is bordered by Sembabule District to the north and northeast, Lwengo District to the east, Rakai District to the south, and Kiruhura District to the west. The coordinates of the district are: 00 25S, 31 10E.

History
The district is composed on one county, Kabula County. Prior to 2007, Kabula County was part of Rakai District. In 2007, the county was split off of Rakai District and given autonomous district status.

Population
In 1991, the national population census estimated the population of the district at about 53,100. During the next census in 2002, the population of Lyantonde District was estimated at about 66,000 with an annual population growth rate of 1.9%. In 2012 the district population was estimated at about 80,200.

Economic activities
Agriculture being the major source of livelihood for the population in Lyantonde District. A variety of crops are grown in the district, both for subsistence and economic purposes. The crops grown include:

Cattle are the main livestock kept by farmers in Lyantonde. It is estimated that there are 83,700 of cattle in the District. Other animals that are raised include goats, sheep, pigs and poultry.

Community health
The district has a heavy disease burden. The most prevalent challenges include:

See also
 Lyantonde
 Central Region, Uganda
 Districts of Uganda

References

External links
Lyantonde District Has One Hospital

 
Districts of Uganda
Central Region, Uganda